Dragged into Sunlight is a British extreme metal band formed in 2006. The band consists of four balaclava-wearing individuals who have not disclosed their identity, and live they play with their backs to the audience, often accompanied by candles and a single stroboscope for lighting and large amounts of smoke. Their intense sound combines influences from all major extreme metal genres. Their debut album, Hatred for Mankind, was produced by the acclaimed Billy Anderson. Following the release of the album the band played Damnation Festival and Maryland Deathfest. Their second album, Widowmaker, is a 40-minute song which received high praise from the music press.

Discography

Studio albums 
Hatred for Mankind (2009, Mordgrimm)
Widowmaker (2012, Prosthetic)

Extended plays 
Terminal Aggressor II (2020, Prosthetic)

Collaboration albums 
NV with Gnaw Their Tongues (2015, Prosthetic)

Live albums 
OCCII, Amsterdam (2011)

Demos 
Terminal Aggressor (2008)

References 

British black metal musical groups
Musical groups established in 2006